The Montréal Open is a yearly professional men's squash tournament held in Montréal, Canada. It takes place every year in late February/early March. It is part of the PSA World Tour. In its current incarnation it is a PSA25 tournament, down from PSA35 in the past.

Results
These are the results from 2010 onwards:

See also
 PSA World Tour

References

PSA World Tour
Squash tournaments in Canada